Dissanayake Mudiyanselage Tikiri Banda Kehelgamuwa (born 10 December 1942, in Gampola) is a former Sri Lankan cricketer and Manager of the Sri Lankan cricket team, under whose tenure the Sri Lanka Test team recorded their first overseas Test victory
in 1995. He was a player from 1967 to 1974, and is considered as one of the best paceman Sri Lanka has ever had.

In September 2018, he was one of 49 former Sri Lankan cricketers felicitated by Sri Lanka Cricket, to honour them for their services before Sri Lanka became a full member of the International Cricket Council (ICC).

Early life
Tikiri Banda Kehelgamuwa was born on 10 December 1942 at Gampola. He began schooling at the Wahalgoda Central College, Gampola, where his father was the Principal. In 1955, he enrolled at Dharmaraja College, where he excelled as an outstanding schoolboy cricketer in the early 1960s. He also represented Dharmaraja at athletics, hockey and soccer.

Kehel was coached by D. M. Dharamatillake, Arthur Alwis and Sonny Yatawara, when he was playing for Dharmaraja. He captained the first XI team in 1960–1961 and was selected the Best Bowler in the island in the "Daily News Schoolboy Cricketer" Contest. Kehelgamuwa won the much coveted Best Schoolboy Bowler award in 1961 and 1962.

While playing for his school team, he was selected to tour India with the Sri Lanka schools team in 1961. He tore apart the South Zone Schools team, taking 8 wickets for 8 runs, with all of his victims clean bowled (9.4–5–8–8). In 1961 he had the proud distinction of representing Sri Lanka in the Gopalan Trophy match under the captaincy of C. I. Gunesekera and later under Michael Tissera.

Police career
Kehelgamuwa joined the Ceylon Police Force in 1963, as a Sup-Inspector of Police and served till his retirement in 2002 as a Deputy Inspector General of Police. He also represented the Police Sports Club at the Government Services Cricket Championships for several years. During his service he was assigned as personal bodyguard of the former Governor-General, William Gopallawa.

Kehel the cricketer
Kehelgamuwa had the distinction of being a member of the Sri Lanka team that beat the MCC for the first time in 1969 in a limited-overs game. He was a member of the Ceylon Government Services Team that toured India in 1972 to play in the Sheesh Mahal Trophy. The CGS team was beaten in the final, but "Kehel" captured 15 wickets in the tournament with an average of 12.30.

Major teams he represented are Ceylon, Nomads Sports Club, Nondescripts Cricket Club and Police Sports Club. During 1961–1974 Sara Trophy seasons, Kehelgamuwa scored more than 1,000 runs and captured more than 500 wickets. He played a large part in helping the Nomads Sports Club to annexe the Sara Trophy in 1965. During Sri Lanka's tour of Pakistan in 1972, he was the only player to be selected from a Division III side (playing for Police SC) to the national squad.

Cricketing administration
He held the position of Manager of the Sri Lankan cricket team on the New Zealand tour of 1995, when Sri Lanka recorded their first overseas victory.

Kehel had the unique distinction of being a selector for 10 years and was the Chairman of the Selection Committee of the Board of Control for Cricket in Sri Lanka in the last two years of his stewardship, 1999 and 2000.

Personal life
While serving as an officer attached to the Panadura Police, Kehel married Hemamalee Wettasinghe, a schoolmistress at St. John's College Panadura in 1971. Their marriage resulted in three daughters, Sonali, Lasanda and Buddika, who eventually graduated from universities in Kelaniya, Colombo and Harvard respectively.

See also
Sri Lanka Cricket

References

External links

Living people
1942 births
Sri Lankan cricketers
Alumni of Dharmaraja College
Sinhalese police officers
Nondescripts Cricket Club cricketers
All-Ceylon cricketers